Level of measurement or scale of measure is a classification that describes the nature of information within the values assigned to variables. Psychologist Stanley Smith Stevens developed the best-known classification with four levels, or scales, of measurement: nominal, ordinal, interval, and ratio. This framework of distinguishing levels of measurement originated in psychology and is widely criticized by scholars in other disciplines. Other classifications include those by Mosteller and Tukey, and by Chrisman.

Stevens's typology

Overview 
Stevens proposed his typology in a 1946 Science article titled "On the theory of scales of measurement". In that article, Stevens claimed that all measurement in science was conducted using four different types of scales that he called "nominal", "ordinal", "interval", and "ratio", unifying both "qualitative" (which are described by his "nominal" type) and "quantitative" (to a different degree, all the rest of his scales). The concept of scale types later received the mathematical rigour that it lacked at its inception with the work of mathematical psychologists Theodore Alper (1985, 1987), Louis Narens (1981a, b), and R. Duncan Luce (1986, 1987, 2001). As Luce (1997, p. 395) wrote:

Comparison

Nominal level  
The nominal type differentiates between items or subjects based only on their names or (meta-)categories and other qualitative classifications they belong to; thus dichotomous data involves the construction of classifications as well as the classification of items. Discovery of an exception to a classification can be viewed as progress. Numbers may be used to represent the variables but the numbers do not have numerical value or relationship:  for example, a globally unique identifier.

Examples of these classifications include gender, nationality, ethnicity, language, genre, style, biological species, and form. In a university one could also use hall of affiliation as an example. Other concrete examples are 
 in grammar, the parts of speech: noun, verb, preposition, article, pronoun, etc.
 in politics, power projection: hard power, soft power, etc.
 in biology, the taxonomic ranks below domains: Archaea, Bacteria, and Eukarya
 in software engineering, type of faults: specification faults, design faults, and code faults

Nominal scales were often called qualitative scales, and measurements made on qualitative scales were called qualitative data. However, the rise of qualitative research has made this usage confusing. If numbers are assigned as labels in nominal measurement, they have no specific numerical value or meaning. No form of arithmetic computation (+, −, ×, etc.) may be performed on nominal measures. The nominal level is the lowest measurement level  used from a statistical point of view.

Mathematical operations
Equality and other operations that can be defined in terms of equality, such as inequality and set membership, are the only non-trivial operations that generically apply to objects of the nominal type.

Central tendency
The mode, i.e. the most common item, is allowed as the measure of central tendency for the nominal type. On the other hand, the median, i.e. the middle-ranked item, makes no sense for the nominal type of data since ranking is meaningless for the nominal type.

Ordinal scale

The ordinal type allows for rank order (1st, 2nd, 3rd, etc.) by which data can be sorted but still does not allow for a relative degree of difference between them. Examples include, on one hand, dichotomous data with dichotomous (or dichotomized) values such as 'sick' vs. 'healthy' when measuring health, 'guilty' vs. 'not-guilty' when making judgments in courts, 'wrong/false' vs. 'right/true' when measuring truth value, and, on the other hand, non-dichotomous data consisting of a spectrum of values, such as 'completely agree', 'mostly agree', 'mostly disagree', 'completely disagree' when measuring opinion.

The ordinal scale places events in order, but there is no attempt to make the intervals of the scale equal in terms of some rule. Rank orders represent ordinal scales and are frequently used in research relating to qualitative phenomena. A student's rank in his graduation class involves the use of an ordinal scale. One has to be very careful in making a statement about scores based on ordinal scales. For instance, if Devi's position in his class is 10 and Ganga's position is 40, it cannot be said that Devi's position is four times as good as that of Ganga. The statement would make no sense at all.
Ordinal scales only permit the ranking of items from highest to lowest. Ordinal measures have no absolute values, and the real differences between adjacent ranks may not be equal. All that can be said is that one person is higher or lower on the scale than another, but more precise comparisons cannot be made. Thus, the use of an ordinal scale implies a statement of 'greater than' or 'less than' (an equality statement is also acceptable) without our being able to state how much greater or less. The real difference between ranks 1 and 2, for instance, may be more or less than the difference between ranks 5 and 6. Since the numbers of this scale have only a rank meaning, the appropriate measure of central tendency is the median. A percentile or quartile measure is used for measuring dispersion. Correlations are restricted to various rank order methods. Measures of statistical significance are restricted to the non-parametric methods (R. M. Kothari, 2004).

Central tendency 
The median, i.e. middle-ranked, item is allowed as the measure of central tendency; however, the mean (or average) as the measure of central tendency is not allowed. The mode is allowed.

In 1946, Stevens observed that psychological measurement, such as measurement of opinions, usually operates on ordinal scales; thus means and standard deviations have no validity, but they can be used to get ideas for how to improve operationalization of variables used in questionnaires. Most psychological data collected by psychometric instruments and tests, measuring cognitive and other abilities, are ordinal, although some theoreticians have argued they can be treated as interval or ratio scales. However, there is little prima facie evidence to suggest that such attributes are anything more than ordinal (Cliff, 1996; Cliff & Keats, 2003; Michell, 2008). In particular, IQ scores reflect an ordinal scale, in which all scores are meaningful for comparison only. There is no absolute zero, and a 10-point difference may carry different meanings at different points of the scale.

Interval scale
The interval type allows for the degree of difference between items, but not the ratio between them. Examples include temperature scales with the Celsius scale, which has two defined points (the freezing and boiling point of water at specific conditions) and then separated into 100 intervals, date when measured from an arbitrary epoch (such as AD), location in Cartesian coordinates, and direction measured in degrees from true or magnetic north. Ratios are not meaningful since 20 °C cannot be said to be "twice as hot" as 10 °C (unlike temperature in Kelvins), nor can multiplication/division be carried out between any two dates directly. However, ratios of differences can be expressed; for example, one difference can be twice another. Interval type variables are sometimes also called "scaled variables", but the formal mathematical term is an affine space (in this case an affine line).

Central tendency and statistical dispersion
The mode, median, and arithmetic mean are allowed to measure central tendency of interval variables, while measures of statistical dispersion include range and standard deviation. Since one can only divide by differences, one cannot define measures that require some ratios, such as  the coefficient of variation. More subtly, while one can define moments about the origin, only central moments are meaningful, since the choice of origin is arbitrary. One can define standardized moments, since ratios of differences are meaningful, but one cannot define the coefficient of variation, since the mean is a moment about the origin, unlike the standard deviation, which is (the square root of) a central moment.

Ratio scale 
See also: 

The ratio type takes its name from the fact that measurement is the estimation of the ratio between a magnitude of a continuous quantity and a unit of measurement of the same kind (Michell, 1997, 1999). Most measurement in the physical sciences and engineering is done on ratio scales. Examples include mass, length, duration, plane angle, energy and electric charge. In contrast to interval scales, ratios can be compared using division. Very informally, many ratio scales can be described as specifying "how much" of something (i.e. an amount or magnitude). Ratio scale is often used to express an order  of magnitude such as for temperature in Orders of magnitude (temperature).

Central tendency and statistical dispersion 
The geometric mean and the harmonic mean are allowed to measure the central tendency, in addition to the mode, median, and arithmetic mean. The studentized range and the coefficient of variation are allowed to measure statistical dispersion. All statistical measures are allowed because all necessary mathematical operations are defined for the ratio scale.

Debate on Stevens's typology 
While Stevens's typology is widely adopted, it is still being challenged by other theoreticians, particularly in the cases of the nominal and ordinal types (Michell, 1986). Some however have argued that the degree of discord can be overstated. Hand says, "Basic psychology texts often begin with Stevens's framework and the ideas are ubiquitous. Indeed, the essential soundness of his hierarchy has been established for representational measurement by mathematicians, determining the invariance properties of mappings from empirical systems to real number continua. Certainly the ideas have been revised, extended, and elaborated, but the remarkable thing is his insight given the relatively limited formal apparatus available to him and how many decades have passed since he coined them."

Duncan (1986) objected to the use of the word measurement in relation to the nominal type, but Stevens (1975) said of his own definition of measurement that "the assignment can be any consistent rule. The only rule not allowed would be random assignment, for randomness amounts in effect to a nonrule".

The use of the mean as a measure of the central tendency for the ordinal type is still debatable among those who accept Stevens's typology. Many behavioural scientists use the mean for ordinal data, anyway. This is often justified on the basis that the ordinal type in behavioural science is in fact somewhere between the true ordinal and interval types; although the interval difference between two ordinal ranks is not constant, it is often of the same order of magnitude.

For example, applications of measurement models in educational contexts often indicate that total scores have a fairly linear relationship with measurements across the range of an assessment. Thus, some argue that so long as the unknown interval difference between ordinal scale ranks is not too variable, interval scale statistics such as means can meaningfully be used on ordinal scale variables. Statistical analysis software such as SPSS requires the user to select the appropriate measurement class for each variable. This ensures that subsequent user errors cannot inadvertently perform meaningless analyses (for example correlation analysis with a variable on a nominal level).

L. L. Thurstone made progress toward developing a justification for obtaining the interval type, based on the law of comparative judgment. A common application of the law is the analytic hierarchy process. Further progress was made by Georg Rasch (1960), who developed the probabilistic Rasch model that provides a theoretical basis and justification for obtaining interval-level measurements from counts of observations such as total scores on assessments.

Other proposed typologies
Typologies aside from Stevens's typology have been proposed. For instance, Mosteller and Tukey (1977), Nelder (1990) described continuous counts, continuous ratios, count ratios, and categorical modes of data. See also Chrisman (1998), van den Berg (1991).

Mosteller and Tukey's typology (1977) 
Mosteller and Tukey noted that the four levels are not exhaustive and proposed:
 Names
 Grades (ordered labels like beginner, intermediate, advanced)
 Ranks (orders with 1 being the smallest or largest, 2 the next smallest or largest, and so on)
 Counted fractions (bound by 0 and 1)
 Counts (non-negative integers)
 Amounts (non-negative real numbers)
 Balances (any real number)

For example, percentages (a variation on fractions in the Mosteller–Tukey framework) do not fit well into Stevens's framework: No transformation is fully admissible.

Chrisman's typology (1998) 
Nicholas R. Chrisman introduced an expanded list of levels of measurement to account for various measurements that do not necessarily fit with the traditional notions of levels of measurement. Measurements bound to a range and repeating (like degrees in a circle, clock time, etc.), graded membership categories, and other types of measurement do not fit to Stevens's original work, leading to the introduction of six new levels of measurement, for a total of ten:
 Nominal
 Gradation of membership
 Ordinal
 Interval
 Log-interval
 Extensive ratio
 Cyclical ratio
 Derived ratio
 Counts
 Absolute

While some claim that the extended levels of measurement are rarely used outside of academic geography, graded membership is central to fuzzy set theory, while absolute measurements include probabilities and the plausibility and ignorance in Dempster–Shafer theory. Cyclical ratio measurements include angles and times. Counts appear to be ratio measurements, but the scale is not arbitrary and fractional counts are commonly meaningless. Log-interval measurements are commonly displayed in stock market graphics. All these types of measurements are commonly used outside academic geography, and do not fit well to Stevens' original work.

Scale types and Stevens's "operational theory of measurement" 
The theory of scale types is the intellectual handmaiden to Stevens's "operational theory of measurement", which was to become definitive within psychology and the behavioral sciences, despite Michell's characterization as its being quite at odds with measurement in the natural sciences (Michell, 1999). Essentially, the operational theory of measurement was a reaction to the conclusions of a committee established in 1932 by the British Association for the Advancement of Science to investigate the possibility of genuine scientific measurement in the psychological and behavioral sciences. This committee, which became known as the Ferguson committee, published a Final Report (Ferguson, et al., 1940, p. 245) in which Stevens's sone scale (Stevens & Davis, 1938) was an object of criticism:

That is, if Stevens's sone scale genuinely measured the intensity of auditory sensations, then evidence for such sensations as being quantitative attributes needed to be produced. The evidence needed was the presence of additive structure – a concept comprehensively treated by the German mathematician Otto Hölder (Hölder, 1901). Given that the physicist and measurement theorist Norman Robert Campbell dominated the Ferguson committee's deliberations, the committee concluded that measurement in the social sciences was impossible due to the lack of concatenation operations. This conclusion was later rendered false by the discovery of the theory of conjoint measurement by Debreu (1960) and independently by Luce & Tukey (1964). However, Stevens's reaction was not to conduct experiments to test for the presence of additive structure in sensations, but instead to render the conclusions of the Ferguson committee null and void by proposing a new theory of measurement:

Stevens was greatly influenced by the ideas of another Harvard academic, the Nobel laureate physicist Percy Bridgman (1927), whose doctrine of operationism Stevens used to define measurement. In Stevens's definition, for example, it is the use of a tape measure that defines length (the object of measurement) as being measurable (and so by implication quantitative). Critics of operationism object that it confuses the relations between two objects or events for properties of one of those of objects or events (Hardcastle, 1995; Michell, 1999; Moyer, 1981a,b; Rogers, 1989).

The Canadian measurement theorist William Rozeboom (1966) was an early and trenchant critic of Stevens's theory of scale types.

Same variable may be different scale type depending on context 
Another issue is that the same variable may be a different scale type depending on how it is measured and on the goals of the analysis. For example, hair color is usually thought of as a nominal variable, since it has no apparent ordering. However, it is possible to order colors (including hair colors) in various ways, including by hue; this is known as colorimetry. Hue is an interval level variable.

See also 
 Cohen's kappa
 Coherence (units of measurement)
 Hume's principle
 Inter-rater reliability
 Logarithmic scale
 Ramsey–Lewis method
 Set theory
 Statistical data type
 Transition (linguistics)

References

Further reading

 
 
 Briand, L. & El Emam, K. & Morasca, S. (1995). On the Application of Measurement Theory in Software Engineering. Empirical Software Engineering, 1, 61–88. [On line] https://web.archive.org/web/20070926232755/http://www2.umassd.edu/swpi/ISERN/isern-95-04.pdf
 Cliff, N. (1996). Ordinal Methods for Behavioral Data Analysis. Mahwah, NJ: Lawrence Erlbaum. 
 Cliff, N. & Keats, J. A. (2003). Ordinal Measurement in the Behavioral Sciences. Mahwah, NJ: Erlbaum. 
 
See also reprints in:
 Readings in Statistics, Ch. 3, (Haber, A., Runyon, R. P., and Badia, P.) Reading, Mass: Addison–Wesley, 1970
 
 
 Lord, F. M., & Novick, M. R. (1968). Statistical theories of mental test scores. Reading, MA: Addison–Wesley.
 
 
 
 Luce, R. D. (2000). Utility of uncertain gains and losses: measurement theoretic and experimental approaches. Mahwah, N.J.: Lawrence Erlbaum.
 
 
 
 
 Michell, J. (1999). Measurement in Psychology – A critical history of a methodological concept. Cambridge: Cambridge University Press.
 
 
 
 Rasch, G. (1960). Probabilistic models for some intelligence and attainment tests. Copenhagen: Danish Institute for Educational Research.
 
 
 Stevens, S. S. (1951). Mathematics, measurement and psychophysics. In S. S. Stevens (Ed.), Handbook of experimental psychology  (pp. 1–49). New York: Wiley.
 Stevens, S. S. (1975). Psychophysics. New York: Wiley.
 

Scientific method
Statistical data types
Measurement
Cognitive science